Belleisle or Belle Île may refer to:

Places
In New Brunswick
Belleisle, New Brunswick, an informal geographic region in the lower Saint John River valley
Belleisle Bay, a fjord-like branch of the St. John River
Belleisle Creek, New Brunswick, a community in Kings County

Elsewhere
Belleisle, Nova Scotia, a community in Annapolis County
Belle Isle Castle, a castle in County Fermanagh, Northern Ireland 
Belle Île, a French island off the coast of Brittany

Ships
 Belleisle Bay Ferry, a cable ferry in New Brunswick
 Belleisle-class ironclad, a British ship class of two ironclads
 HMS Belleisle, three ships of the Royal Navy

See also
Belle Isle (disambiguation)
Belle Island (disambiguation)
Bell Island (disambiguation)